Ameles moralesi is a species of praying mantis found in Morocco.

References

moralesi
Endemic fauna of Morocco
Mantodea of Africa
Insects of North Africa
Insects described in 1936
Taxa named by Ignacio Bolívar